Çöl Dəllək (also, Chël’dellyak and Chol’-Dallyak) is a village and municipality in the Sabirabad Rayon of Azerbaijan.  It has a population of 365.

References 

Populated places in Sabirabad District